Divanlı may refer to the following villages:

Divanlı, Barda -  A village in the Barda Rayon of Azerbaijan.
Divanlı, Yozgat - A village in the Yozgat Province of Turkey.